Ballinskelligs Priory was an Augustinian priory (strictly an Arrouaisian house of Austinian canons) located in Ballinskelligs on the Iveragh Peninsula in Kerry, Ireland.

References 

Augustinian monasteries in the Republic of Ireland